Law & Order: Trial by Jury is an American legal drama television series about criminal trials set in New York City. It was the fourth series in Dick Wolf's Law & Order franchise. The show's almost exclusive focus was on the criminal trial of the accused, showing both the prosecution's and defense's preparation for trial, as well as the trial itself. The series was first announced on September 28, 2004. The series premiered on Thursday, March 3, 2005, and ended on January 21, 2006. Its regular time slot was Fridays 10/9 p.m. ET on NBC. The last episode aired on Court TV months after the series' cancellation.

Overview 

Trial by Jury focuses on criminal legal procedures and preparation that are rarely depicted on other Law & Order series, such as jury selection, deliberations in the jury room, as well as jury research and  mock trials prepared by the defense to use psychological studies and socioeconomic status profiling to their advantage. The episodes usually start with a witness or victim's personal account of a crime. This is a departure from the other Law & Order series, which usually begin by depicting either the actual crime or its discovery/reporting by civilians. The show progresses on from that point, showing how both sides develop their strategies for winning the case. In addition, a few episodes show jury deliberations. The show develops the judges as characters, showing scenes of them conferring with each other and reusing the same judges in multiple episodes.

Plot 
The series follows Bureau Chief Tracey Kibre (Bebe Neuwirth), an Executive Assistant District Attorney assigned to Manhattan's homicide division. Kibre's team, including District Attorney Investigator Lennie Briscoe (Jerry Orbach) and Assistant District Attorney Kelly Gaffney (Amy Carlson), follows up on leads and interview witnesses, as well as participating in trials, during which both sides examine witnesses and give arguments. Similarly, the defense's preparation varies from episode to episode, running the gamut from testing arguments in front of jury focus groups to deal-making between co-defendants. Several pretrial meetings are held where some procedural issue is argued and ruled on.

Cast and characters

Main cast 
 Bebe Neuwirth as Tracey Kibre, the Homicide Bureau Chief in the Manhattan District Attorney's office. Tracey has a black-and-white view of the law. She is tough, tenacious, focused, and professional. Kibre has a strong working relationship with her staff. As chief of the Homicide Bureau, she is a senior prosecutor, subordinate only to the District Attorney and the Executive ADA. 
 Amy Carlson as Kelly Gaffney, an ADA. Gaffney is Kibre's Deputy, who often challenges her senior colleague. She sees the law in shades of gray, and as a result is often more by-the-book.
 Kirk Acevedo as Hector Salazar, a DA investigator. Salazar retired from the police force following an on-the-job injury which would have forced him behind a desk.
 Scott Cohen as Chris Ravell, an NYPD detective assigned to the ADA Kibre's team and Hector Salazar's second partner, succeeding Lennie Briscoe. Cohen was credited as a guest appearance for episode 3 before being added to the main credits in episode 5. He did not appear in episode 4.
 Fred Dalton Thompson as Arthur Branch, the County of New York's District Attorney. Branch is a tough Republican, who practices both legal and political conservatism.  Thompson was simultaneously a series regular in the same role on this show and on the original Law & Order.
 Jerry Orbach as Lennie Briscoe, a DA investigator. Briscoe was the longest-serving police detective of the original Law & Order. Orbach succumbed to cancer over two months before the show's premiere, and he only appeared in the first two episodes of the series. From episode 3 onward, he is never seen or mentioned again for the remainder of the series.

Recurring cast 
 Candice Bergen as Amanda Anderlee, a New York Supreme Court judge in Manhattan (under New York State's archaic judicial nomenclature, the "Supreme Court" is a trial-level court and not the highest court in the state).
Carey Lowell as Jamie Ross, a New York Supreme Court judge in Manhattan and former Assistant District Attorney.
 Seth Gilliam as Terence Wright, an Assistant District Attorney.
 Jessica Chastain as Sigrun Borg, an Assistant District Attorney.

Crossover guest cast

Episodes

Ratings

Cancellation
NBC announced on May 16, 2005, that Trial by Jury would not be returning for the 2005–2006 fall television season. The rival CBS procedural Numbers debuted in the midseason in late January 2005 and consistently beat NBC's Medical Investigation in the ratings, sending the latter show into hiatus and eventual cancellation, freeing up the time slot for Law & Order: Trial by Jury. Despite Trial by Jurys pedigree, Numbers ratings remained strong, often beating Trial by Jury in both overall and key demographic ratings. 

In an October 2005 interview with the Associated Press, Wolf stated that NBC had assured him Trial by Jury would return for the fall of 2005, but had "blindsided" him by canceling it instead. Though still having reasonable ratings that could have given the series a second season, the main reason for the cancellation according to Kevin Reilly, NBC's brand-new president of entertainment at the time, was due to the networks acquisition of Sunday Night Football for what was coming in the 2005-06 season, which took away programming space for NBC. As Reilly would state, "Now that we have football [on Sundays, beginning in 2006], we only have five nights of entertainment programming. When we had six nights, we could accommodate four Law & Orders."

Trial by Jury was the first series of the Law & Order franchise to be canceled. The sets were reused by a series Wolf produced for NBC entitled Conviction which premiered Friday, March 3, 2006, lasting only one season before cancellation. The network Court TV (now TruTV) re-aired the entire series, including the episode "Eros in the Upper Eighties", which never aired on NBC before the series was canceled. TNT has aired the episode "Skeleton" on occasion, as the conclusion to the original series episode "Tombstone".

Home media
On April 25, 2006, Universal Studios Home Entertainment released Law & Order: Trial by Jury – The Complete Series on DVD in Region 1.

References

External links
  on Wolf Entertainment
 
 

 
2005 American television series debuts
2006 American television series endings
2000s American crime drama television series
2000s American legal television series
2000s American mystery television series
2000s American police procedural television series
English-language television shows
NBC original programming
Television series by Universal Television
Television shows set in New York City
Television shows filmed in New York City
American television spin-offs
Fictional portrayals of the New York City Police Department
Television series created by Dick Wolf
Television series by Wolf Films
Television series based on actual events
New York Supreme Court
Television series about prosecutors